Gabriel Santana Pinto or simply Gabriel (born 6 January 1990) is a Brazilian footballer, who plays as an attacking midfielder for CSA.

Career

Bahia

Flamengo
On 10 January 2013 Flamengo signed Gabriel from Bahia, acquiring 50% of his economic rights for R$6.7 million.

Sport (loan)
Since the end of the 2017 season Gabriel began to lose space in the Flamengo's first team. As result of that he was loaned to Sport on 15 January 2018 to play at the club until the end of the 2018 season.

Career statistics
.

Honours
Bahia
 Campeonato Baiano: 2012

Flamengo
 Copa do Brasil: 2013
 Campeonato Carioca: 2014, 2017

Kashiwa Reysol
 J2 League: 2019

CSA
Campeonato Alagoano: 2021

References

External links

Twitter

1990 births
Living people
Sportspeople from Salvador, Bahia
Brazilian footballers
Esporte Clube Bahia players
CR Flamengo footballers
Sport Club do Recife players
Kashiwa Reysol players
Coritiba Foot Ball Club players
Centro Sportivo Alagoano players
Campeonato Brasileiro Série A players
Campeonato Brasileiro Série B players
J2 League players
Association football midfielders